Arthur Doneghue (31 May 1897 – 8 December 1960) was a New Zealand cricketer. He played in six first-class matches for Wellington from 1919 to 1928.

See also
 List of Wellington representative cricketers

References

External links
 

1897 births
1960 deaths
New Zealand cricketers
Wellington cricketers
Cricketers from Sydney